Haywire is the fourth studio album by American country music singer Josh Turner. It was released on February 9, 2010 via MCA Nashville and debuted at number five on the U.S. Billboard 200, and number two on the Top Country Albums, selling 85,000 copies. The album produced three singles, including the Number One hits "Why Don't We Just Dance" and "All Over Me." As with his previous three studio albums, Turner worked with producer Frank Rogers.

Background
After the release of "Why Don't We Just Dance" in August, Turner's website announced that the album would be released on November 10, but on October 2, online magazine Country Standard Time reported that the release of Haywire was delayed until February 9, 2010.

On January 12, 2010, Billboard published an album preview of Haywire, where Turner talked about the new album. Regarding its content, Turner told Billboard that the album "goes a little deeper about love and relationships" than previous records.

Eight days later, Engine 145 released an interview with Turner. When asked why he decided to name his new CD Haywire, Turner responded that the title track "felt pretty relevant as to the world right now and my life, too." When asked about following the theme of Haywire in terms of songs, he said, "If I had to sum it up, it would be energy, a lot of positive energy. It’s an album that’s full of songs that will make people dance. There’s a lot of passion there. Vocally, I stepped out of my box more; I let ‘er rip and you can hear that on a lot of different songs, whether it be a ballad or an uptempo."

Content
The album's first single is "Why Don't We Just Dance". Written by Jim Beavers, Darrell Brown and Jonathan Singleton, it was released to radio on August 12, 2009, and became Turner's third Number One hit in February 2010. Following it on the album is "I Wouldn't Be a Man," which was originally a Top Ten hit for Don Williams in 1987, and was also a minor chart hit nine years later by Billy Dean.

"All Over Me" was released as the second single from the album in April 2010, and peaked at Number One in October of that year. "I Wouldn't Be a Man" was released as the third single in November 2010, and was a minor Top 20 country hit, peaking at number 18 in July 2011.

The deluxe edition includes live recordings of Turner's previous singles "Long Black Train" and "Your Man," two other bonus songs, and the music video for "Why Don't We Just Dance."

Reception

Commercial
Haywire debuted at number five on the U.S. Billboard 200 and at number two on the U.S. Billboard Top Country Albums, selling 85,000 copies in its first week of release. As of November 2010, the album has sold 330,000 copies in the U.S. It was certified Gold by the RIAA on March 25, 2017.

Critical

Upon its release, Haywire received generally positive reviews from most music critics. At Metacritic, which assigns a normalized rating out of 100 to reviews from mainstream critics, the album received an average score of 63, based on 5 reviews, which indicates "generally favorable reviews".

Thom Jurek of Allmusic commended the production, which he described as "reined in sonically with more acoustic instrumentation, less compression, and vocals placed properly in their relation to the instrumental mix" but thought that "the song choices that make this set sound so flat" giving it 2½ stars out of 5. Jessica Phillips of Country Weekly magazine gave the album four stars out of five, saying that it followed in the formula set by Turner's previous three albums, adding that its song selection "complements Josh's booming, polished bass voice better than those on albums past" despite also saying that the album "takes few new risks.".

PopMatters critic Dave Heaton gave it a "Damn Good" rating, saying "There is a carefree feeling to Haywire that’s infectious, that makes the album’s ordinariness not matter", and commended his "deep, supple voice". Juli Thanki of country music blog Engine 145 also gave the album a positive review; praising Turner as "the finest male voice on country radio," but commenting that the album lacked any "exceptional songs." Thanki gave the album 3½ stars out of 5.

Matt Bjorke with Roughstock gave it a favorable review, saying "Haywire is one of Josh Turner’s most consistent albums and it really feels like a record that will help keep him a radio star". Slant Magazine critic Jonathan Keefe reviewed the album's material unfavorably, referring to the material as "pure vanilla" and saying "a stuffy, aesthetically conservative set of songs at odds with Turner's stated intentions of loosening up a bit," though he noted that Turner's vocal performances attempt to bring "some life and personality" to the songs and rated the set with three stars out of five.

Track listing

Personnel

Technical
 Craig Allen - Art Direction, Design
 Brady Barnett - Digital Editing
 Richard Barrow - Digital Editing, Engineer, Overdub Engineer, String Engineer
 Steve Beers - Assistant
 Steve Blackmon - Assistant
 Drew Bollman - Mixing Assistant
 George Holz - Photography
 Tyler Moles - Digital Editing
 Seth Morton - Assistant
 Justin Niebank - Mixing
 Mark Pettacia - Assistant
 Lowell Reynolds - Assistant
 Frank Rogers - Producer
 Manny Rogers - Keyboard Engineer
 Mike Rooney - Assistant
 Phillip Stein - Digital Editing, Production Assistant
 Trish Townsend - Stylist, Wardrobe
 Josh Turner - Art Direction, Photography
 Paula Turner - Hair Stylist, Make-Up
 Hank Williams - Mastering
 Brian David Willis - Digital Editing

Additional musicians
 David Angell - Strings
 Zeneba Bowers - Strings
 J. T. Corenflos - Electric Guitar
 Eric Darken - Percussion
 David Davidson - Strings
 Chip Davis - Choir
 Shannon Forrest - Drums
 Kevin Grantt - Bass Guitar, Upright Bass
 Aubrey Haynie - Fiddle, Mandolin
 Connie Heard - Strings
 Steve Hinson - Steel Guitar, Dobro
 Wes Hightower - Background Vocals
 John Hobbs - String Arrangements, Conductor
 Mike Johnson - Pedabro
 Gayle Mayes - Choir
 Gordon Mote - Hammond B-3 Organ, Piano, Wurlitzer
 Steve Nathan - keyboards
 Angela Primm - Choir
 Frank Rogers - Keyboards
 Brent Rowan - Baritone Guitar, Electric Guitar
 Ladye Love Smith - Choir
 Reggie Smith - Choir
 Chris Stapleton - Background Vocals
 Bryan Sutton - Banjo, Acoustic Guitar, Gut String Guitar
 Russell Terrell - Background Vocals
 Josh Turner - Lead Vocals
 Kristin Wilkinson - String Arrangements, Strings

Charts

Weekly charts

Year-end charts

Certifications

References

2010 albums
MCA Records albums
Josh Turner albums
Albums produced by Frank Rogers (record producer)